Megistias (Greek: Μεγιστίας, "the greatest one") or Themisteas was a soothsayer from Acarnania who died in the Battle of Thermopylae. He traced his lineage to Melampus. Despite knowing that death was certain, Megistias stayed and fought. An inscription was written by Simonides of Ceos, a personal friend of Megistias, to honor him.

In popular culture

In the 1962 movie The 300 Spartans, Megistias appears as a Spartan priest and soothsayer and friend of King Leonidas who, in addition to giving predictions, also acts as a physician for the Spartans at Thermopylae.  Megistias was portrayed by Charles Fernley Fawcett.

References

5th-century BC clergy
5th-century BC Greek people
Ancient Greek seers
Battle of Thermopylae
Ancient Greeks killed in battle
480 BC deaths
Ancient Acarnanians
Year of birth unknown
Greek people of the Greco-Persian Wars